Remix to Sing is a 1991 EP by American female vocal group En Vogue. It is their first remix album which was released on November 26, 1991 by East West Records. The EP features remixes of songs from their platinum debut album Born to Sing. Also included are the three hit singles; "Hold On", "You Don't Have to Worry" and "Lies" which all peaked at No. 1 on Billboard's Hot R&B Songs chart.

Track listing
All songs written and produced by Denzil Foster and Thomas Elroy, except noted otherwise.

Personnel
Vocals, lead vocals, backing vocals, vocals [dialogues] – Cindy Herron, Dawn Robinson, Maxine Jones, Terry Ellis
Keyboards [additional], percussion [additional] – Eric Kupper
Engineer – Stephen Seltzer
Piano – Terry Burrus
Engineer – Everett Ramos
Remix [producer] – Steve Hurley, Dave Hall, Frankie Knuckles, Chuckii Booker, Eddie F, Martin Van Blockson & Marley Marl
Vocals [dialogues], keyboards, drum machine [programming] – Denzil Foster, Thomas McElroy
Vocals [rap] – Debbie T (tracks: 2)
Producer, arranger, composer – Denzil Foster, Thomas McElroy

References

En Vogue albums
1991 debut EPs
1991 remix albums
East West Records remix albums